Masayoshi Nagata (Japanese: 永田 雅宜 Nagata Masayoshi; February 9, 1927 – August 27, 2008) was a Japanese mathematician, known for his work in the field of commutative algebra.

Work
Nagata's compactification theorem shows that varieties can be embedded in complete varieties. The Chevalley–Iwahori–Nagata theorem describes the quotient of a variety by a group.

In 1959 he introduced a counterexample to the general case of Hilbert's fourteenth problem on invariant theory. His 1962 book on local rings contains several other counterexamples he found, such as a commutative Noetherian ring that is not catenary, and a commutative Noetherian ring of infinite dimension.

Nagata's conjecture on curves concerns the minimum degree of a plane curve specified to have given multiplicities at given points; see also Seshadri constant. Nagata's conjecture on automorphisms concerns the existence of wild automorphisms of polynomial algebras in three variables. Recent work has solved this latter problem in the affirmative.

Selected works

References

 

1927 births
2008 deaths
20th-century Japanese mathematicians
21st-century Japanese mathematicians
People from Ōbu, Aichi
Academic staff of Kyoto University
Nagoya University alumni
Algebraists